The 1976–77 Greek Football Cup was the 35th edition of the Greek Football Cup. The competition culminated with the Greek Cup Final, held at Karaiskakis Stadium, on 22 June 1977. The match was contested by Panathinaikos and PAOK, with Panathinaikos winning by 2–1.

Calendar

Knockout phase
In the knockout phase, teams play against each other over a single match. If the match ends up as a draw, extra time will be played. If a winner doesn't occur after the extra time the winner emerges by penalty shoot-out.The mechanism of the draws for each round is as follows:
There are no seedings, and teams from the same group can be drawn against each other.

First round

|}

Bracket

Second round

|}

Round of 16

|}

Quarter-finals

|}

Semi-finals

|}

Final

The 33rd Greek Cup Final was played at the Karaiskakis Stadium.

References

External links
Greek Cup 1976-77 at RSSSF

Greek Football Cup seasons
Greek Cup
Cup